"Jumbo Breakfast Roll" is a 2006 single by Irish comedian Pat Shortt, under the guise of Showband singer 'Dicksie Walsh'. The subject of the song is the ubiquitous (in Ireland) breakfast roll.

The song was a number one hit in the Republic of Ireland for six weeks. It was the best selling song of 2006 in Ireland, outselling Shakira's "Hips Don't Lie" by 500 copies.

According to figures compiled by GfK Chart-Track Jumbo Breakfast Roll came in at number 11 on the list of top selling songs of the decade. Pat Howe, music manager for HMV Ireland described it as a "guilty pleasure" and noted the Irish have a thing for novelty songs.

Reprise 
A reprise, called "Where Did My Money Go", deals with running out of money.

References

External links 
 Jumbo Breakfast Roll Lyrics
 One Hit Wonders in Ireland

2006 singles
Irish Singles Chart number-one singles
Irish novelty songs